The Great Masturbator (1929) is a painting by Salvador Dalí executed during the surrealist epoch, and is currently displayed at Museo Nacional Centro de Arte Reina Sofía, Madrid.

Description

The centre of the painting has a distorted human face in profile looking downwards, based on the shape of a natural rock formation at Cap de Creus along the sea-shore of Catalonia. A similar profile is seen in Dalí's more famous painting of two years later, The Persistence of Memory. A nude female figure (resembling Dalí's then-new muse, Gala) rises from the back of the head; this may be the masturbatory fantasy suggested by the title. The woman's mouth is near a thinly clad male crotch, a suggestion that fellatio may take place. The male figure seen only from the waist down has bleeding fresh cuts on his knees.  Below the central profile head, on its mouth, is a grasshopper, an insect Dali referred to several times in his writings.  A swarm of ants (a popular motif representing sexual anxiety in Dalí's work) gather on the grasshopper's abdomen, as well as on the prone face. In the landscape below, three other figures are arranged, along with an egg (commonly used as a symbol of fertility) and sparse other features. Two of the characters in the landscape are arranged in such a way as to cast a long single shadow, while the other character is seen hurriedly walking into the distance on the peripheries of the canvas. On the back of the central head figure, a formation of two rocks and a potted dry plant can be seen, the pot of the plant placed over the bottom rock while balancing the other rock on top of it in an unrealistic way. This part is thought to represent the escape-of-reality idea found in many of Dalí's other works.

Interpretation
The painting may represent Dalí's severely conflicted attitudes towards sexual intercourse. In Dalí's youth, his father had left out a book with explicit photos of people suffering advanced untreated venereal diseases to "educate" the boy. The photos of grotesquely damaged diseased genitalia fascinated and horrified young Dalí, and he continued to associate sex with putrefaction and decay into his adulthood.

The inclusion of the grasshopper and ants crawling on the bottom of the stone head may stem from Dalí's experience with delusional parasitosis. The disease was not first published about until 1937, however Dalí described struggling with sensations of bugs crawling on his skin in his autobiography.

Comparisons have been made to Hieronymus Bosch's The Garden of Earthly Delights. The Great Masturbator is similar to an image on the right side of the left panel of The Garden of Earthly Delights composed of rocks, bushes and little animals resembling a face with a prominent nose and long eyelashes.

History
Dalí kept the painting in his personal collection, displayed at the Dalí Theatre and Museum in Figueres, willing it to the national collection of Spain upon his death, when it was removed to the Madrid museum.

See also
 The Garden of Earthly Delights

References

External links
 The Great Masturbator on csulb.edu
 The Great Masturbator on Museo Nacional Centro de Arte Reina Sofía
 The Great Masturbator description - Gala-Salvador Dalí Foundation

1929 paintings
Erotic art
Insects in art
Paintings by Salvador Dalí
Paintings in the collection of the Museo Nacional Centro de Arte Reina Sofía
Surrealist paintings